The AR-M1, also known as AK-47M1, is a Bulgarian assault rifle designed primarily for export. It is a modernized Bulgarian derivative of the AKK, which itself is based on the Soviet AK-47 (specifically Type 3). The AR-M1 can be chambered for both the 5.56×45mm NATO and 7.62×39mm cartridges.

History 

During the 1950s, the Bulgarian People's Army was equipped primarily with AK-47s imported from the Soviet Union. However, by the early 1960s, the Bulgarian government became interested in producing the AK-47 domestically. Assembly of AK-47s, initially from imported Soviet parts, began at the state arsenal in Kazanlak. By the mid 1960s, the Kazanlak facility was equipped to begin licensed production of the weapon type and its associated parts. Kalashnikov rifles assembled and later manufactured in Kazanlak received the designation AKK. A derivative with a folding stock was also produced under license as the AKKS.

After the dissolution of the People's Republic of Bulgaria in the early 1990s, the Kazanlak factory became a joint-stock company known as Arsenal AD. Arsenal offered several modernized variants of the AKK for export, which were rebranded as the AR series. The AR pattern rifles are basically AKKs with different furniture and a few unique features, such as polymer stocks and handguards, as well as several external parts copied directly from the AK-74 including new flash hiders, sights, gas blocks, bayonet mountings and bayonets. Their receivers are milled, rather than stamped, unlike other modernized AK derivatives, and are virtually indistinguishable from those of the early Type 3 pattern Soviet AK. A derivative of the AKKS is also offered for export as the ARF.

Versions 
The -F model features a folding stock.
 AR-M1 / AR-M1F - improved AK-47 copy with an AK-74 front sight base, flash suppressor, black polymer stock set, luminous spots on the iron sights and a rail for mounting optics. Chambered in 5.56×45mm NATO and 7.62×39mm.
 AR-M2 / AR-M2F - improved AK-47 copy like the AR-M1/AR-M1F, but with a shortened barrel, AKS-74U front sight base and muzzle booster/flash suppressor hybrid.
 AR-M4SF - extremely short development of the AKSU  with red dot sight, provision to mount a night vision or laser sight. Chambered in 5.56×45mm NATO and 7.62×39mm.
 AR-M7F - improved AK-47 copy like the AR-M1, but with an AK-101-style folding stock.
 AR-M9 / AR-M9F - improved AK-47 copy like the AR-M1/AR-M1F, features a thumb-operable fire selector and a different style polymer stock set.
 AR / AR-F - improved AK-47 copies with black polymer lining and optional luminous sights.

Users 

 
 
 
 
 
 : 3500 5.45 AR-M1 rifles imported
 : 5.56 AR-M4SF used by the Police

 : AR-M1F used by Tontaipur.
 : 751 5.56mm AR-M1F rifles, also AR-M1s
 
 : 11th Lightning Battalion uses AR-M9s
 : AR-M1's used by the Police of North Macedonia.
 : Philippine Army confirmed use of AR-M52F assault rifle from Bulgaria during 125th founding anniversary on 23 March 2022, used by First Special Forces Regiment.
 : Arsenal AR
 : Used by DANAB Brigade.
 : AR-M9s
 : AR-M2 supplied to training forces in the 
 : AR-M9s
 : AR-M1's used by US Army OPFOR.
 : AR-M9s

Non-state actors

References 

5.56×45mm NATO assault rifles
7.62×39mm assault rifles
Firearms of Bulgaria
Kalashnikov derivatives